SMS G196 was a S-138-class large torpedo boat of the Imperial German Navy. She was built by the Germaniawerft shipyard at Kiel between 1910 and 1911, and was launched on 25 May 1911, entering service later that year. She served throughout the First World War, taking part in the Battle of Heligoland Bight on 28 August 1914. She was renamed T196 in February 1918.

Post war, T196 served in the Weimar Republic's Reichsmarine, being rebuilt and modernised in 1923. She was still in service on the outbreak of the Second World War, taking part in the German Invasion of Poland at the start of the war and the evacuation of East Prussia towards the end of the war in Europe.

She survived the war, and was transferred to the Soviet Navy in 1945, and was renamed  Pronzitelny. The ship was stricken in 1949.

Construction and design
The Imperial German Navy ordered 12 large torpedo boats (Große Torpedoboote) as part of the fiscal year 1910 shipbuilding programme, with one half-flotilla of six ships ordered from Germaniawerft and the other six ships from AG Vulcan. The two groups of torpedo boats were of basically similar layout but differed slightly in detailed design, with a gradual evolution of design and increase in displacement with each year's orders.

The ship was armed with two 8.8 cm L/45 guns, one on the forecastle and one aft. Four single 50 cm (19.7 in) torpedo tubes were fitted, with two on the ship's beam in the gap between the forecastle and the ship's bridge which were capable of firing straight ahead, one between the ship's two funnels, and one aft of the funnels. The ship had a crew of 84 officers and men.

G196 was laid down at Germaniawerft's Kiel shipyard as Yard number 156 and was launched on 25 May 1911 and completed on 2 October 1911.

The ship was extensively modified in 1923, with the forecastle being lengthened to behind the first funnel, the bridge structure and funnels being modified. Two 10.5 cm L/45 guns replaced the 8.8 cm guns, while the torpedo armament remained four 50 cm tubes, but arranged in two single and one twin mount. By the Second World War, her torpedo tubes had been removed, while two 20 mm anti-aircraft guns had been added.

Service
On commissioning, G196 joined the 2nd Half Flotilla of the 1st Torpedo Flotilla, and remained part of the 2nd Half Flotilla in 1914.

First World War
On 28 August 1914, the  British Harwich Force, supported by light cruisers and battlecruisers of the Grand Fleet, carried out  a raid towards Heligoland with the intention of destroying patrolling German torpedo boats. Four  German light cruisers and another flotilla of torpedo boats (the 5th Torpedo Boat Flotilla) was in the vicinity of Heligoland. G196, a member of the 2nd Half Flotilla of the 1st Torpedo Flotilla, formed part of the outer screen of torpedo boats. At about 06:00 on 28 August, another member of the outer screen reported spotting the periscope of a submarine. As a result, the 5th Torpedo Boat Flotilla was ordered out to hunt the hostile submarine. At 07:57 G194 was fired on by British warships, and soon G194 and G196 were retreating towards Heligoland, pursued by four British destroyers. The Torpedo boat , leader of the 1st Flotilla, trying to return to Heligoland on hearing gunfire, ran into the midst of the Harwich force and was sunk. G196 was undamaged.

On 11 September 1915, the German cruisers  and  set out from Wilhelmshaven to lay a minefield off the Swarte Bank in the North Sea, with the High Seas Fleet sailing in support. On the return trip, the High Seas Fleet ran into a newly laid British minefield.

In 1918 G196 joined an Escort Flotilla, and she was renamed T196 on 22 February 1918.  She remained a member of the 1st Half-flotilla of the 1st Escort Flotilla at the end of the war.

Between the wars
After the end of the First World War, the scuttling of the German High Seas Fleet at Scapa Flow on 21 June 1919 and the Treaty of Versailles left Germany with a small navy of obsolete warships.  The Versailles treaty limited the German Navy's torpedo forces to 16 destroyers and 16 torpedo boats, with only twelve of each in active service, with replacement of the existing ships not allowed until 15 years after they were launched. Replacements could not exceed 800 t displacement for destroyers and 200 t for torpedo boats. T196 was retained as a destroyer under the treaty, and remained in active service in the new Reichsmarine. In 1923 T196 was allocated to the North Sea station. T196 was modernised in 1923, but was still obsolete and in the 1930s was transferred to subsidiary roles, being used for training and as a Fleet Tender, and from 1938 as a minesweeper command ship.

Second World War
On the outbreak of the Second World War on 1 September 1939, T196 was the flagship of the Officer Commanding Minesweepers and was deployed in support on the German Invasion of Poland. On 4 September T196, along with the pre-dreadnought battleship  and the old minesweeper Von der Groeben (formerly ), bombarded  Westerplatte.

In late January 1945, the Germans began a mass evacuation of soldiers and civilians from East Prussia and Danzig, which were threatened by the advance of Soviet forces. On 10 February T196 and the torpedo recovery vessel TF19 were escorting the liner Steuben from Pillau, when the Soviet submarine S-13 torpedoed and sank Steuben. Only about 300 of the more than 3000 aboard could be saved.

Soviet Union
On 27 December 1945 T196 was transferred to the Soviet Union as a War Prize, named Pronzitelny The ship joined the Soviet Baltic Fleet in February 1946 and was stricken for scrapping on 30 April 1949.

Notes

References

Bibliography

 

Torpedo boats of the Imperial German Navy
World War I torpedo boats of Germany
Ships built in Kiel
1911 ships